Bob Reynolds is an American jazz tenor saxophonist. A solo recording artist since 2000, he has been a member of the popular "genre-bending" instrumental group  Snarky Puppy since 2014, winning Grammy Awards with the band for the albums Culcha Vulcha Live at the Royal Albert Hall, and Empire Central.

Career
Born in Morristown, New Jersey, his family moved to Jacksonville, Florida. He started playing saxophone at age 13 and attended high school at Douglas Anderson School of the Arts with a well-known jazz band. After graduating, he attended Berklee College of Music where he studied with George Garzone and Hal Crook.  He has played with John Mayer's band for five years, and has also worked with Brian Blade, Aaron Goldberg, Gregory Hutchinson, and Tom Harrell.

His 2006 album Can't Wait for Perfect was voted Best Debut in the Village Voice jazz poll. Reynolds received a Grammy Award with Snarky Puppy in 2017, four ASCAP Young Jazz Composer awards, and Berklee's Billboard Magazine Endowed Scholarship.

Discography

As leader
 Live at the Jazz Corner (BRM, 2003)
 Can't Wait for Perfect (Fresh Sound, 2005)
 Live in New York (BRM, 2010)
 A Live Life (BRM, 2011)
 Somewhere In Between (BRM, 2013)
 Déjà Vu (BRM, 2015)
 Guitar Band (BRM, 2017)
 Hindsight (BRM, 2017)
 Quartet (BRM, 2018)
 A Message for Mobley (BRM, 2019)
 Runway (BRM, 2020)
 Boston 2000 (BRM, 2022)

As sideman
With Snarky Puppy
 We Like It Here  (Ropeadope, 2014)
 Culcha Vulcha (GroundUP, 2016)
 Immigrance (GroundUP, 2019)
 [[Live at the Royal Albert Hall (Snarky Puppy album)|Live at the Royal Albert Hall,']] (GroundUP, 2020)Empire Central (GroundUP, 2022)

With others
 Janek Gwizdala, The Space In Between (Gwizmon, 2010)
 John Mayer, Where the Light Is (Columbia, 2008)
 John Mayer, Battle Studies (BMG, 2009)
 Ninja Sex Party, "Smooth Talkin'"
 Jonah Smith, Industry Rule (BGR, 2001)
 Jonah Smith, Beneath the Underdog (BGR, 2003)
 Anthony Wilson, Frogtown (Goat Hill, 2016)
 The 1975, "If You're Too Shy (Let Me Know)" (Notes on a Conditional Form, 2020)

Awards and honors
4x ASCAP Young Jazz Composer Awards
Berklee's Billboard Magazine Endowed Scholarship
2016: Member of Snarky Puppy on Culcha Vulcha, Grammy Award for Best Contemporary Instrumental Album
2021: Member of Snarky Puppy on Live at the Royal Albert Hall, Grammy Award for Best Contemporary Instrumental Album.
2023: Member of Snarky Puppy on Empire Central'' , Grammy Award for Best Contemporary Instrumental Album.

References

External links
 Official website
 Bob Reynolds on ON THE HIT with DEANE OGDEN podcast, March 25, 2014

Living people
American jazz tenor saxophonists
American male saxophonists
American jazz soprano saxophonists
Berklee College of Music alumni
1977 births
21st-century American saxophonists
21st-century American male musicians
American male jazz musicians
Snarky Puppy members